The 1966 Nebraska Cornhuskers football team represented the University of Nebraska–Lincoln as a member of the Big Eight Conference in the 1966 NCAA University Division football season. The team was coached by Bob Devaney and played their home games at Memorial Stadium in Lincoln, Nebraska.

Schedule

Roster

Depth chart

|}

Coaching staff

Game summaries

TCU

Utah State

Iowa State

Wisconsin

Kansas State

Colorado

Missouri

Kansas

Oklahoma State

Oklahoma

Alabama

Rankings

Awards
 NCAA 5th District Coach of the Year: Bob Devaney
 UPI Big 8 Player of the Year: Wayne Meylan
 All American: LaVerne Allers, Wayne Meylan, Larry Wachholtz
 All Big 8: LaVerne Allers, Kaye Carstens, Bob Churchich, Wayne Meylan, Kelly Petersen, Bob Pickens, Lynn Senkbeil, Carel Stith, Larry Wachholtz, Harry Wilson

Future professional players
 Kaye Carstens, 1967 13th-round pick of the Chicago Bears
 Dick Czap, 1966 12th-round pick of the Cleveland Browns
 Dick Davis, 1969 12th-round pick of the Cleveland Browns
 Ben Gregory, 1968 5th-round pick of the Buffalo Bills
 Ron Kirkland, 1967 9th-round pick of the Indianapolis Colts
Wayne Meylan, 1968 4th-round pick of the Cleveland Browns
 Bob Pickens, 1966 3rd-round pick of the Bears
 Carel Stith, 1967 4th-round pick of the Houston Oilers
 Bob Taucher, 1968 7th-round pick of the Dallas Cowboys
 Pete Tatman, 1967 10th-round pick of the Minnesota Vikings
 Harry Wilson, 1967 3rd-round pick of the Philadelphia Eagles

References

Nebraska
Nebraska Cornhuskers football seasons
Big Eight Conference football champion seasons
Nebraska Cornhuskers football